Memoirs of the American Mathematical Society is a mathematical journal published in six volumes per year, totalling approximately 33 individually bound numbers, by the American Mathematical Society. It is intended to carry papers on new mathematical research between 80 and 200 pages in length.  Usually, a bound number consists of a single paper, i.e., it is a monograph.

The journal is indexed by Mathematical Reviews, Zentralblatt MATH, Science Citation Index, Research Alert, CompuMath Citation Index, and Current Contents.

Other journals from the AMS 
 Bulletin of the American Mathematical Society
 Journal of the American Mathematical Society
 Notices of the American Mathematical Society
 Proceedings of the American Mathematical Society
 Transactions of the American Mathematical Society

External links 
 

American Mathematical Society academic journals
Mathematics journals
Bimonthly journals
English-language journals
Publications established in 1950